The list of ship decommissionings in 1913 includes a chronological list of all ships decommissioned in 1913.


February

24 February 

 Plunger:  Decommissioned and sold for scrap

See also 

1913
Decom
Ship